Stanton Woods is a  biological Site of Special Scientific Interest south of Stanton in Suffolk.

The site consists of several ancient coppice with standards woods, some of which are on boulder clay and others on drier, acid soil. There are also mown rides and small clearings. The Grundle is a linear wooded gorge.

Some areas are closed to the public, but others have roads and footpaths running through them.

References

Sites of Special Scientific Interest in Suffolk